Aquamortierella is a fungal genus in the Mortierellaceae family of the Zygomycota. The genus is monotypic, containing the single species Aquamortierella elegans, found in New Zealand and Japan.

The genus name of Aquamortierella is in honour of Barthélemy Dumortier (1797–1878), who was a Belgian who conducted a parallel career of botanist and Member of Parliament.

The genus was circumscribed by Robert W. Embree and Hiroharu Indoh in Bull. Torrey Bot. Club Vol.94 (Issue 6) on pages 464–467 in 1967.

References

External links

Fungi of Asia
Fungi of New Zealand
Monotypic fungi genera
Zygomycota genera